Paul Dessen Gjesdahl (22 December 1893 – 14 August 1969) was a Norwegian journalist and theatre critic. He was a theatre critic for the newspaper Dagbladet from 1919 to 1930, for Tidens Tegn from 1930 to 1937, and for Arbeiderbladet from 1937 to 1967.

He was a chairman of the Norwegian Students' Society in 1919 and a member of Mot Dag, a board member of the Norwegian Critics' Association for 36 years, and vice chairman of the Norwegian Broadcasting Council from 1946 to 1955.

Selected works

References

1893 births
1969 deaths
People from Halden
Norwegian theatre critics
Mot Dag
20th-century Norwegian journalists